Oran or Odran (Gaelic Oran/Odran/Odhrán, the dh being silent; Latin Otteranus, hence sometimes Otteran; died AD 548), by tradition a descendant of Conall Gulban, was a companion of Saint Columba in Iona, and the first Christian to be buried on that island. St. Odhrán's feast day is on 27 October.

Life
Odran lived for over forty years in the area now known as Silvermines, in County Tipperary, Ireland, building a church there in 520. According to Irish tradition, Odran also served as abbot of Meath, and founded Lattreagh. In 563, he was among the twelve who accompanied St Columba to the Scottish island of Iona, where he died and was buried. Columba is said to have seen devils and angels fight over Odran's soul before it ascended into heaven.

One popular legend surrounding Odran's death is that he consented to being buried alive beneath a chapel that Columba was attempting to build at Iona. A voice had told Columba that the walls of the chapel would not stand until a living man was buried below the foundations, and indeed, each morning the builders would arrive at the site to find all their work of the previous day undone. So Odran was consigned to the earth, and the chapel was erected above him. One day, however, Odran lifted his head out of the ground and said: "There is no Hell as you suppose, nor Heaven that people talk about". Alarmed by this, Columba quickly had the body removed and reburied in consecrated ground – or, in other versions of the story, simply called for more earth to cover the body.

In a Hebridean version of this tale, Odran was promised that his soul would be safe in heaven. Sometime after the burial, Columba wanted to see Odran once more and opened the pit under the chapel. When Odran saw the world, he tried to climb out of his grave, but Columba had the pit covered with earth quickly to save Odran's soul from the world and its sin.

These legends are one of the few instances of foundation sacrifice in Great Britain. While the story of St. Odran's self-sacrifice does not appear in Adomnán's Life of Columcille, George Henderson says that the legend points to an ancient folk-belief. He believes this is similar to the Arthurian legend of the building of Dinas Emris, where Vortigern was counselled to find and sacrifice "a child without a father" to ensure that the fortress walls did not collapse.

Due to the similarity of the name, some people have identified Odran with Saint Odran, the first Irish Christian martyr. There is a parallel in that each man voluntarily sacrificed himself to further the work of a better-known saint.

Legacy
The oldest remaining church on Iona is dedicated to Saint Odran. The surrounding cemetery is called Reilig Odhráin in his memory.

St. Odran is the patron saint of the parish of Silvermines, County Tipperary. He was chosen by the Vikings as patron of the city of Waterford in 1096 and later chosen as patron of the diocese.

In culture
Neil Gaiman's poem "In Relig Odhrain", published in Trigger Warning: Short Fictions and Disturbances (2015), retells the story of Oran's death.

Stephen McDonald's song "Oran" on CD Stone of Destiny songs of the tale of Oran and his demise.

References
General
Farmer, David Hugh (1987). The Oxford Dictionary of Saints. Oxford University Press, Oxford. New York. 2nd Edition. 
Specific

548 deaths
6th-century Christian saints
Medieval Irish saints
Medieval Scottish saints
Premature burials
Deaths by live burial
6th-century Irish abbots
Human sacrifice
Irish expatriates in Scotland
Year of birth unknown
People from County Meath